List of events from the year 2021 in Kenya.

Incumbents
President: Uhuru Kenyatta

Monthly events
Ongoing – COVID-19 pandemic in Kenya

January to March
8 January
COVID-19 pandemic: 97,954 positive cases, 80,671 recoveries to date.
The United Nations releases Sh164 million (US$1.5 million) to fight locusts.
28 January – Kenya orders 118 armored Katmerciler Hızır vehicles from Turkey at a price of €60 million (USD $73 million).
4 February – Gregory Dow, 61, a Christian missionary from Lancaster, Pennsylvania is sentenced to 15 years in prison for sexually abusing four underage girls at an orphanage he founded near Boito.
9 March – U.S. national Isaac Sturgeon, 32, is deported to JFK Airport in New York after being charged in crimes related to the January 2021 Washington riot.
24 March – The government orders the United Nations High Commissioner for Refugees (UNHCR) to close the Dadaab and the Kakuma refugee camps, home to 410,000 refugees.
25 March – Three DJs on ″Homeboyz Radio Lift-Offare″ are suspended after blaming Eunice Wangari, 20, for getting pushed out of a 12-story window while resisting sexual advances.

Sports
18-21 and 23-26 March — Kenya Open and Kenya Savannah Classic (golf) at Karen Country Club in Nairobi
17–22 August — 2021 World Athletics U20 Championships
23 August — Tusker FC wins The 2020–21 FKF Premier League.
24 August–5 September — Kenya at the 2020 Summer Paralympics

Deaths
6 February – Hosea Kiplagat, 76, politician and philanthropist.
15 February – John Oyioka, politician, MP (20172021).
22 February – Two Rothschild's giraffes; electrocuted
22 March – Lorna Irungu, 50–51, television presenter and media relations executive; COVID-19.
29 March – Sarah Onyango Obama, 99, educator and philanthropist, grandmother of former U.S. President Barack Obama; complications from diabetes and a stroke.
8 September - Orie Rogo Manduli, 73, Politician.

See also

COVID-19 pandemic in Africa
Al-Shabaab (militant group)
African Continental Free Trade Area
International Conference on the Great Lakes Region

References

External links

allAfrica (Kenya), AllAfrica news website
The Standard (newspaper)
The Star (newspaper)
UK-Africa trade: What will Brexit change? (by Kate Hairsine, DW, January 18, 2021)
How the Nairobi Expressway is changing Kenya's capital (BBC News, 13 Feb 2021) 

 
2020s in Kenya
Years of the 21st century in Kenya
Kenya
2021 in Africa